Mtskheta Park is a multi-use stadium in Mtskheta, Georgia.  It is used mostly for football matches and is the home stadium of FC WIT Georgia. The stadium is able to hold 2,000 people.

See also 
Stadiums in Georgia

Sports venues in Georgia (country)
Football venues in Georgia (country)
Buildings and structures in Mtskheta